Sullivan County is a county in the U.S. state of Indiana, and determined by the US Census Bureau to include the mean center of U.S. population in 1940. As of 2020, the population was 20,758. The county seat (and the county's only incorporated city) is Sullivan.

Sullivan County is included in the Terre Haute, Indiana, metropolitan statistical area.

History
On February 25, 1779, Col. George Rogers Clark captured Fort Sackville at Vincennes from the British. This small naval battle completed the destruction of British military strength in the Wabash Valley.

The county's first settlement occurred between 1808 and 1812, by a religious society of celibates known as Shakers.

General William Henry Harrison’s army made its last camp in Sullivan County at Big Springs on September 29, 1811. Harrison used Benjamin Turman's fort as his headquarters. With spring water available, it was an ideal location for 1000 men, including 160 dragoons and 60 mounted riflemen. A Kentucky soldier killed a fellow Kentuckian, Clark, either accidentally or in a grudge fight. The deceased was buried at the top of a hill that became the Mann Turman Cemetery. General Harrison and his troops continued north on the Wea Indiana Trail to build Fort Harrison and then proceeded to the Battle of Tippecanoe.

While escorting supplies from Fort Knox near Vincennes to Fort Harrison at Terre Haute, Sergeant Nathan Fairbanks and approximately a dozen soldiers were ambushed - and most killed - by Indians.

In 1815, Carlisle was founded.

An act of the Indiana legislature dated December 30, 1816, created Sullivan County, with areas partitioned from Knox County. The effective date of the new government was 15 January 1817, with interim commissioners charged to begin organizing the new government in February. It was named for Daniel Sullivan, a prominent frontiersman killed in 1790 by Native Americans while carrying a dispatch between Fort Vincennes and Louisville.

A log courthouse in Merom served as Sullivan County's first county seat from 1819 to 1842. Merom was an important river port and a stop on the stage route known as The Old Harrison Trail. William Henry Harrison's troops camped near here on their 1811 march to the Battle of Tippecanoe.

Pioneer heroine of abdominal surgery Jane Todd is buried in Sullivan County. Born in Virginia in 1763, she and her husband, Thomas Crawford, moved to Green County, Kentucky, in 1805. Suffering from a huge abdominal tumor, she rode  to Danville, Kentucky, to submit to a never−before−performed surgical procedure. On Christmas Day 1809, Dr. Ephraim McDowell performed the first ovariotomy, in his home. The ordeal lasted 25 minutes. There was no anesthesia. Mrs. Crawford recovered completely and years later came to Graysville to live with her son, Thomas, a Presbyterian minister. She died in 1842 at age 78. The restored McDowell home in Danville, Kentucky, is a surgical shrine.

Sullivan was founded in 1853 and became the county seat.

Dedicated in 1862, Union Christian College served as a preparatory school and college until 1924. In 1936 it became Merom Institute—a rural enrichment center. Now owned by the United Church of Christ, it serves as a camp, conference, and retreat center.

Numerous violent conflicts erupted in Sullivan County during the American Civil War over differing war sentiments. On July 14, 1864, anti-war Democrat John Drake was fatally shot at a community picnic near here.

In November 1902, a mob abducted James Dillard from the Sullivan County sheriff, John S. Dudley, as he was being taken to Sullivan. After kidnapping Dillard, they lynched him. In response to the lynching, Governor Winfield Durbin dismissed the sheriff - a decision which was in line with Indiana's 1899 anti-lynching law. However, Sheriff Dudley ultimately remained in office after he and other officials entered into a legal battle about the decision.

Organized nationally to bring culture to rural communities, Merom's 10-day religious and educational Chautauqua event featured concerts, debates, plays, and lectures. Carrie Nation, William Jennings Bryan, William Howard Taft, Warren G. Harding, and Billy Sunday were among its speakers.

In 1968, the Sullivan County Park and Lake was created. It contains a  reservoir for swimming, boating, and fishing. The lake is stocked with crappie, hybrid saugeye, bass, bluegill, and channel catfish. Water skiing is popular. Sullivan County Park and Lake has  of land for camping and a 9-hole golf course. The campground offers sites ranging from primitive camping to space for motor homes.

Geography
Sullivan County lies on the west edge of Indiana; its western border abuts the state of Illinois (across the Wabash River). The meanders of the Wabash delineate the county's west border. The upper part of the county is drained by Turtle Creek, which flows southwestward into the river. The lower part of the county is similarly drained by Busseron Creek.

The county's abundant woods were largely cleared and devoted to agriculture during the nineteenth century. At present only the drainages remain wooded.

Adjacent counties

 Vigo County − north
 Clay County − northeast
 Greene County − east
 Knox County − south
 Crawford County, Illinois − west
 Clark County, Illinois − northwest

Protected areas

 Elliott Woods State Nature Preserve
 Greene-Sullivan State Forest (part)
 Redbird State Recreation Area (part)
 Shakamak State Park (part)
 Sullivan County Park and Lake
 Turtle Creek Reservoir

City
 Sullivan - county seat

Towns

 Carlisle
 Dugger
 Farmersburg
 Hymera
 Merom
 Shelburn

Unincorporated communities

 Baker
 Baldridge
 Benefiel Corner
 Bucktown
 Cass
 Curryville
 Dodds Bridge
 East Shelburn
 Fairbanks
 Gambill
 Gilmour − part
 Glendora
 Graysville
 Greenville
 Hawton
 Jackson Hill
 Jericho
 Lewis − part
 Massacre
 Merom Station
 New Lebanon
 Paxton
 Pleasantville
 Riverton
 Riverview
 Scotchtown
 Scott City
 Shiloh
 Standard
 Stringtown
 Wilfred

Ghost towns
 Caledonia
 Farnsworth

Townships

 Cass
 Curry
 Fairbanks
 Gill
 Haddon
 Hamilton
 Jackson
 Jefferson
 Turman

Transportation

Major highways

  U.S. Route 41
  U.S. Route 150
  State Road 48
  State Road 54
  State Road 58
  State Road 63
  State Road 154
  State Road 159

Airport
The county contains one public-use airport, the Sullivan County Airport (SIV) at Sullivan.

Economy
Peabody Energy Corporation The Bear Run mine is the largest surface mine in the eastern U.S. and was expected to produce 12 million tons of coal per year. The mine employed 500 employees in 2012. However, as national coal demand declined, its production was cut back (to 7.2 million tons in 2016 and 2017, to 6.8 in 2018), and in November 2019 there were further reductions and layoffs.

Education
Sullivan County is served by two school corporations, the Southwest School Corporation and the Northeast School Corporation. The former's high school is Sullivan High School in Sullivan, and the latter's high schools are North Central High School in Farmersburg and Union High School in Dugger. Union Christian College formerly operated in Merom.

Climate and weather

Government

The county government is a constitutional body, and is granted specific powers by the Constitution of Indiana, and by the Indiana Code.

County Council: The legislative branch of the county government; controls spending and revenue collection in the county. Representatives are elected to four-year terms from county districts. They set salaries, the annual budget, and special spending. The council has limited authority to impose local taxes, in the form of an income and property tax that is subject to state level approval, excise taxes, and service taxes.

Board of Commissioners: The executive body of the county; commissioners are elected county-wide to staggered four-year terms. One commissioner serves as president. The commissioners execute acts legislated by the council, collect revenue, and manage the county government.

Court: The county maintains a small claims court that handles civil cases. The judge on the court is elected to a term of four years and must be a member of the Indiana Bar Association. The judge is assisted by a constable who is also elected to a four-year term. In some cases, court decisions can be appealed to the state level circuit court.

County Officials: The county has other elected offices, including sheriff, coroner, auditor, treasurer, recorder, surveyor, and circuit court clerk. These officers are elected to four-year terms. Members elected to county government positions are required to declare party affiliations and to be residents of the county.

Demographics

2010 census
As of the 2010 United States Census, there were 21,475 people, 7,823 households, and 5,422 families in the county. The racial makeup of the county was 93.7% white, 4.5% black or African American, 0.3% American Indian, 0.2% Asian, 0.3% from other races, and 1.0% from two or more races. Those of Hispanic or Latino origin made up 1.4% of the population. In terms of ancestry, 20.8% were German, 19.8% were American, 10.3% were Irish, and 9.7% were English.

Of the 7,823 households, 31.7% had children under the age of 18 living with them, 53.4% were married couples living together, 10.8% had a female householder with no husband present, 30.7% were non-families, and 26.7% of all households were made up of individuals. The average household size was 2.45 and the average family size was 2.94. The median age was 39.8 years.

The median income for a household in the county was $47,697 and the median income for a family was $52,558. Males had a median income of $44,645 versus $26,335 for females. The per capita income for the county was $20,093. About 8.5% of families and 11.9% of the population were below the poverty line, including 12.9% of those under age 18 and 11.7% of those age 65 or over.

See also
 National Register of Historic Places listings in Sullivan County, Indiana

References

External links 
 
Discover Sullivan County
Sullivan County Genealogy Trails

 
Indiana counties
1817 establishments in Indiana
Populated places established in 1817
Terre Haute metropolitan area